Vincent Milou (born 15 May 1998 in Marseille) is a French skateboarder. He has competed in men's park events at several World Skate Championships, finishing fifth in 2018 and 30th in 2019.

He competed in the men's park event at the 2021 Tokyo Olympics.

References 

French skateboarders
Skateboarders at the 2020 Summer Olympics
1998 births
Living people
Olympic skateboarders of France
Sportspeople from Marseille
21st-century French people